Énri Ó Connmhaigh was Bishop of Clonfert and Bishop of Kilmacduagh.

Bishop Ó Connmhaigh was one of at least two bearers of the surname (now rendered as Conway to hold this office. He was succeeded by a Seaán Ó Connmhaigh, who became bishop in 1441. An apparent kinsman, Máel Muire Ó Connaig, who held the office from  may have been a relative who bore an earlier version of the surname.

Ó Connmhaigh, originally bishop of Clonfert, was  translated from that diocese to Kilmacduagh on 11 March 1405. He succeeded Gregorius Ó Leaáin, whose office was vacant from his death in 1397 until Énri was appointed in 1405. He in turn was succeeded at some unknown date by Dionysius (died 1410).

See also
Catholic Church in Ireland

References

 The Surnames of Ireland, Edward MacLysaght, 1978.
 A New History of Ireland: Volume IX – Maps, Genealogies, Lists, ed. T.W. Moody, F.X. Martin, F.J. Byrne, pp. 322–324.

External links
 http://www.ucc.ie/celt/published/T100005C/
 http://www.irishtimes.com/ancestor/surname/index.cfm?fuseaction=Go.&UserID=

People from County Galway
15th-century Roman Catholic bishops in Ireland